Utricularia ameliae is a terrestrial carnivorous plant belonging to the genus Utricularia (family Lentibulariaceae). It is only known from the discharge mound spring habitats of far western Queensland, Australia.

See also 
 List of Utricularia species

References 

Carnivorous plants of Australia
Flora of Queensland
ameliae
Lamiales of Australia